Holsti is a surname. Notable people with the surname include:

Kalevi Holsti (born 1935), Canadian political scientist
Ole Holsti (1933–2020), American political scientist 
Rudolf Holsti (1881–1945), Finnish politician, journalist, and diplomat

See also
Holst (surname)